Skaizerkite is the third album from Montt Mardié. The album was made available for pre-order on March 4 and was officially released on April 8, 2009.

It was received positively in Mardié's homeland of Sweden, garnering significant radio play.

Track listing
 "Welcome to Stalingrad"
 "One Kiss"
 "Click Click"
 "Elisabeth by the Piano"
 "Bang Bang (Echo in Warsaw)"
 "Unknown Pleasures" (Feat Hanna Lovisa)
 "Last Year in Marienbad"
 "A Wedding in June" (Feat Andreas Mattsson)
 "Dancing Shoes"
 "The Stairs of the House That Haunted This Town (Jenny, Jenny, Jenny)"
 "Dungeons and Dragons"
 "I Love You Annie"

References

2009 albums
Montt Mardié albums